Windycon is a science fiction convention held in Lombard, Illinois, on the weekend closest to Veterans Day.

ISFiC, the parent corporation that runs Windycon, was founded in 1973 in Chicago. The first Windycon was held the following year and has been held annually ever since either in Chicago or a Chicago suburb. It is a general interest convention.

ISFiC and Windycon were founded to raise the profile of fandom in Chicago in preparation for a Worldcon bid.  In 1982, Chicon IV was the result.  From its small beginnings, Windycon has grown to have an annual membership hovering around 1300.  It is the largest of the two fan-run Chicago conventions.

Annually since 1986, ISFiC has hosted a writers contest, open to unpublished authors.  The contest is judged by professional authors and editors. Separately, Windycon has hosted a writers' workshop under the coordination of Richard Chwedyk since 2000.

In addition to traditional con activities, Windycon has also run a series of on-line chats during the con, hosting by Cybling.

References

External links 

ISFiC, Windycon's parent corporation

Science fiction conventions in the United States
Festivals in Illinois
Recurring events established in 1973
Creative writing programs